Sandy Springs is an unincorporated community and census-designated place (CDP) in Anderson County, South Carolina, United States. It was first listed as a CDP in the 2020 census with a population of 1,002.

It is located on U.S. Route 76 between Anderson and Clemson. The name comes from a literal spring in the sands.

It is the birthplace of Freddie Stowers, the only African-American to be awarded the Medal of Honor for his service in World War I.

Demographics

2020 census

Note: the US Census treats Hispanic/Latino as an ethnic category. This table excludes Latinos from the racial categories and assigns them to a separate category. Hispanics/Latinos can be of any race.

See also
Mount Zion Presbyterian Church

References

Census-designated places in Anderson County, South Carolina
Census-designated places in South Carolina
Unincorporated communities in Anderson County, South Carolina
Unincorporated communities in South Carolina